Etherloop is a kind of  DSL technology that combines the features of Ethernet and DSL. It allows the combination of voice and data transmission on standard phone lines. Under the right conditions it will allow speeds of up to 6 megabits per second over a distance of up to 6.4 km (21,000 feet).

Etherloop uses half-duplex transmission, and as such, is less susceptible to interference caused by poor line quality, bridge taps, etc.  Also, etherloop modems can train up through line filters (although it is not recommended to do this).

Etherloop has been deployed by various internet service providers in areas where the loop length is very long or line quality is poor. Some Etherloop modems (those made by Elastic Networks) offer a "Central Office mode", in which two modems are connected back to back over a phone line and used as a LAN extension. An example of a situation where this would be done is to extend Ethernet to a building that is too far to reach with straight Ethernet.

See also 
 Ethernet in the first mile (especially 2BASE-TL)

References 

Computer networking